Discovery Harbour is an unincorporated community and census-designated place on the island of Hawaii in Hawaii County, Hawaii, United States. Its population was 1,171 as of the 2020 census. The community is located near the island's southern tip, south of Hawaii Route 11. It is the southernmost populated place in the 50 states of the U.S., surpassing Naalehu by 5.4 miles (8.7 km).

Geography

Demographics

References

External links
Discovery Harbour Community Association

Populated places on Hawaii (island)
Unincorporated communities in Hawaii County, Hawaii
Unincorporated communities in Hawaii
Census-designated places in Hawaii County, Hawaii
Populated coastal places in Hawaii